Henrik Fagerli Rukke  (born 20 October 1996) is a Norwegian speed-skater who competes internationally.

He has been selected to participate in the 2018 Winter Olympics.

Rukke represents the club Hol IL, and is a brother of speed-skater Christoffer Fagerli Rukke.

References

External links
 
 
 

1996 births
Norwegian male speed skaters
Speed skaters at the 2018 Winter Olympics
Olympic speed skaters of Norway
Living people
People from Hol
Speed skaters at the 2012 Winter Youth Olympics
World Sprint Speed Skating Championships medalists
Sportspeople from Viken (county)
21st-century Norwegian people